In mathematics, a Paley–Wiener theorem is any theorem that relates decay properties of a function or distribution at infinity with analyticity of its Fourier transform.  The theorem is named for Raymond Paley (1907–1933) and Norbert Wiener (1894–1964).  The original theorems did not use the language of distributions, and instead applied to square-integrable functions.  The first such theorem using distributions was due to Laurent Schwartz. These theorems heavily rely on the triangle inequality (to interchange the absolute value and integration).

Holomorphic Fourier transforms
The classical Paley–Wiener theorems make use of the holomorphic Fourier transform on classes of square-integrable functions supported on the real line.  Formally, the idea is to take the integral defining the (inverse) Fourier transform

and allow ζ to be a complex number in the upper half-plane.  One may then expect to differentiate under the integral in order to verify that the Cauchy–Riemann equations hold, and thus that f defines an analytic function.  However, this integral may not be well-defined, even for F in L2(R) — indeed, since ζ is in the upper half plane, the modulus of eixζ grows exponentially as  — so differentiation under the integral sign is out of the question.  One must impose further restrictions on F in order to ensure that this integral is well-defined.

The first such restriction is that F be supported on R+: that is, F ∈ L2(R+).  The Paley–Wiener theorem now asserts the following: The holomorphic Fourier transform of F, defined by

for ζ in the upper half-plane is a holomorphic function.  Moreover, by Plancherel's theorem, one has

and by dominated convergence, 

Conversely, if f is a holomorphic function in the upper half-plane satisfying

then there exists F in L2(R+) such that f is the holomorphic Fourier transform of F.

In abstract terms, this version of the theorem explicitly describes the Hardy space H2(R). The theorem states that

This is a very useful result as it enables one to pass to the Fourier transform of a function in the Hardy space and perform calculations in the easily understood space L2(R+) of square-integrable functions supported on the positive axis.

By imposing the alternative restriction that F be compactly supported, one obtains another Paley–Wiener theorem.  Suppose that F is supported in [−A, A], so that F ∈ L2(−A,A).  Then the holomorphic Fourier transform

is an entire function of exponential type A, meaning that there is a constant C such that

and moreover, f is square-integrable over horizontal lines:

Conversely, any entire function of exponential type A which is square-integrable over horizontal lines is the holomorphic Fourier transform of an L2 function supported in [−A, A].

Schwartz's Paley–Wiener theorem
Schwartz's Paley–Wiener theorem asserts that the Fourier transform of a distribution of compact support on Rn is an entire function on Cn and gives estimates on its growth at infinity. It was proven by Laurent Schwartz (1952).

Generally, the Fourier transform can be defined for any tempered distribution; moreover, any distribution of compact support v is a tempered distribution. If v is a distribution of compact support and f is an infinitely differentiable function, the expression

is well defined.

It can be shown that the Fourier transform of v is a function (as opposed to a general tempered distribution) given at the value s by

and that this function can be extended to values of s in the complex space Cn.  This extension of the Fourier transform to the complex domain is called the Fourier–Laplace transform.

Additional growth conditions on the entire function F impose regularity properties on the distribution v. For instance:

In particular, let K be a convex compact set in Rn with supporting function H, defined by

  

Then the singular support of v is contained in K if and only if there is a constant N and sequence of constants Cm such that

for

Notes

References
 .
.
 
 .
 .

Theorems in Fourier analysis
Generalized functions
Theorems in complex analysis
Hardy spaces